Water polo was contested for men only at the 1967 Summer Universiade in Tokyo, Japan.

References
 Universiade water polo medalists on HickokSports

1967 Summer Universiade
Universiade
1967
1967